Gul Agha Ishakzai (born ), also known as Mullah Hidayatullah Badri, is the current Finance Minister of the Islamic Emirate of Afghanistan since 24 August 2021.

Biographical information
Gul Agha was born in Band-e-Temur, Maiwand District, Kandahar Province. He belongs to the Ishaqzai tribe, and was a childhood friend of Taliban founder Mullah Mohammed Omar. He has also been known as Mullah Gul Agha, Mullah Gul Agha Akhund, Hidayatullah, Haji Hidayatullah, Hayadatullah.

Role in the Taliban
During the insurgency period, Agha led the Taliban's financial commission. His role within the Taliban organization was to collect taxes (zakat) from Baluchistan Province, Pakistan. He has organised funding for suicide attacks in Kandahar, Afghanistan, and for Taliban fighters and their families. He also has links to the related Haqqani network. A number of countries and international organisations; including the United States, the United Nations, and the European Union, have implemented sanctions against him and his associates under counter-terrorism financing measures.

He was a long-time associate of Mohammed Omar; he served as Omar's principal finance officer and one of his closest advisors, living in the presidential palace with him during the first Taliban regime.

He was made head of Talibans' Financial Commission in mid-2013. According to a UN Security Council report in January 2015, Agha, together with other members of the Quetta Shura, showed interest in restarting peace negotiations with the Afghan Government.

On 24 August 2021, he was appointed acting finance minister by the new Islamic Emirate of Afghanistan.

References

External links
 Circular Letter: CL-2010 numbered 051

Living people
1972 births
Taliban government ministers of Afghanistan
Pashtun people
Afghan expatriates in Pakistan
People from Kandahar Province
Finance Ministers of Afghanistan